Scott de la Vega is an American attorney who served as the acting United States Secretary of the Interior in the Biden administration from January 20, 2021, to March 16, 2021. De la Vega served an interim capacity until Biden's nominee, Deb Haaland, was confirmed by the United States Senate on March 15, 2021, and sworn in the next day.

Career 
De la Vega earned a Bachelor of Arts degree in political science from the University at Albany, SUNY and a Juris Doctor from the Syracuse University College of Law. He was a member of the Judge Advocate General's Corps and worked a litigator for the United States Department of Housing and Urban Development. De la Vega previously served as the director of the Department of the Interior's ethics office.

References 

Living people
University at Albany, SUNY alumni
Syracuse University College of Law alumni
United States Secretaries of the Interior
United States Department of the Interior officials
Biden administration cabinet members
Year of birth missing (living people)